American Aborigines, may refer to:

 Indigenous peoples of the Americas
 Indigenous Canadians
 First Nations (disambiguation)
 Inuit
 Métis (Canada)
 Alaska Natives
 Native Americans in the United States
 Native Hawaiians